Sam Anthony William Barratt (born 2002 in Stoke-on-Trent) is an English professional footballer who plays for Glossop North End, as a defender.

Career
Barratt started his career in the Academy of his local club at Stoke City. In the summer of 2019, he decided to leave Stoke to sign a scholarship with EFL League One side Fleetwood Town, believing that he would get more minutes and be able to progress into the under-23 side.
He made his first team debut as a second-year scholar on 10 November 2020, when he replaced Sam Finley as an 89th minute substitute as they beat Sunderland 2–1 in the EFL Trophy Group Stage. He was captain of the under-18 side that won the league title during the 2020–21 season. Despite this, on 30 April 2021, it was announced that he would be released by Fleetwood at the end of his apprenticeship and he departed the club.

Following on from his release he had a short spell at Northern Premier League Division One west side Leek Town in August 2021, before moving to divisional rivals Glossop North End at the end of the month. He made his debut for Glossop in an away trip to City of Liverpool in August 2021 which ended in a 1–1 draw. He then suffered a shoulder injury against Clitheroe, but still went onto have an impact on the season, making 32 appearances and scoring twice. On 13 June 2022, he committed to another season with Glossop North End for the 2022–23 campaign.

Career statistics

References

2002 births
Living people
Fleetwood Town F.C. players
Leek Town F.C. players
Glossop North End A.F.C. players
Northern Premier League players
Association football defenders
English footballers